Hu Daoping (1971 – April 14, 2006), also known by his alias Wu Jun, was a Chinese criminal and serial killer who killed seven people during robberies between 2003 and 2005 after escaping from prison.

Biography 
Hu, originally raised in a poor family from Chongqing, married a woman in 1993, and later fathered a child in 1995. In that same year, he racked up a charge for theft, after which he was sentenced to eight years in prison.

Murders 
Three years into his sentence, Hu escaped prison and fled to Sichuan in June 1998, carrying on his criminal escapades. In May 2000, Hu stole nearly 10,000 yuan from the philatelic store in a Yuechi County Post Office. On December 1, 2003, he robbed a Jintai Jewelry Shop in Yuechi County of more 400,000 yuan, while also murdering the shop owner Fu Jianguo and guard Yang Lin.

On January 13, 2005 Hu entered the Yuechi County post office and attempted to rob the vault, killing two police officers Cheng Zeping and Zhang Yong that were present. In April, he attempted to rob a jewelry store in Guang'an, but the plot failed. On September 6, Hu killed three union guards (including Jiang Weiyang and Zheng Ying) at the White Temple Credit Union. Afterwards he robbed the place of more than 180,000 yuan and fled.

Execution  
Four days later, Hu was arrested by authorities. On December 7, 2005, he was sentenced to death, he was deprived of political rights for life, and all his personal property was confiscated.

Before the verdict an interview with him was conducted, in which he confessed to everything. On April 14, 2006 Hu was executed.

Victims 
Hu killed the following people:

 Cheng Zeping (程泽平), police officer
 Zhang Yong (张勇), police officer
 Fu Jianguo (付建国), burned to death, owner of shop
 Yang Lin (杨林), burned to death, guard of shop
 Jiang Weiyang (蒋维阳), guard
 Zheng Ying (郑英), guard

Personal life 
Hu Daoping was married to Zhu Nianqiong (朱埝琼). After Hu Daoping was sentenced death, Zhu was found guilty of attempting to cover up the crime. Zhu was sentenced to three years in prison with a suspended sentence of four years.

See also 
 List of serial killers by country
 List of serial killers by number of victims

References 

1971 births
2006 deaths
20th-century Chinese criminals
21st-century Chinese criminals
Chinese male criminals
Chinese people convicted of murder
Executed Chinese serial killers  
Male serial killers
People convicted of murder by China
People from Chongqing